Harold Mann may refer to:

 Harold Mann (swimmer) (born 1942), American swimmer and Olympic champion
 Harold Mann (Australian footballer) (born 1940), former Australian rules footballer
Harold Mann (boxer) (1938–2016), Canadian boxer
Harold Hart Mann (1872-1961), English chemist, bacteriologist, and agricultural scientist

See also
Harry Mann, police officer and politician